Friedrich Rückert (7 July 1920 – 5 May 2011) was an Austrian field hockey player. He competed in the men's tournament at the 1948 Summer Olympics.

References

External links
 

1920 births
2011 deaths
Austrian male field hockey players
Olympic field hockey players of Austria
Field hockey players at the 1948 Summer Olympics
Place of birth missing